Johan Harmen Rudolf Köhler (3 July 1818 – 14 April 1873) was a Dutch general in the Royal Netherlands East Indies Army.

Life 
Köhler was born in 1818 in Groningen, the son of a sergeant major in the Royal Dutch Army.

He enlisted in the infantry in 1832, at the age of 14, where he steadily progressed through the officer ranks and, in 1839, moved to the Dutch East Indies, where he joined the Royal Netherlands East Indies Army, also steadily climbing the ranks.

As a captain in 1856, he partook in a punitive expedition to suppress insurgents in the Lampung District. His actions earned him a knighthood fourth class in the Military Order of William in January 1857. After a promotion to colonel in 1865, he was given military command over West Sumatra.

Köhler was killed while leading the First Aceh Expedition in 1873.

References 

1818 births
1873 deaths
Aceh War
Dutch military personnel killed in the Aceh War
People from Groningen (city)
Royal Netherlands East Indies Army generals
Royal Netherlands East Indies Army officers